Michael Gurski (born 21 March 1979) is a German football coach who played as a goalkeeper. He works as a goalkeeping coach with SpVgg Unterhaching.

Career
Born in Tübingen, Gurski started his senior career with Stuttgarter Kickers, then SSV Reutlingen 05. Between 2001 and December 2003, he played for Kickers Offenbach, two games in the 2. Bundesliga and 10 in the Regionalliga Süd. He could not beat keeper Philipp Heerwagen to the number one spot, and moved to Borussia Fulda in January 2004.

After half a year in Fulda, he moved to TuS Koblenz where he played until summer 2008. In 2006, he was in the team that got promoted to the 2. Bundesliga. Eventually he lost his number one spot, and he was released on a free transfer. On 1 July 2008, he signed for SV Sandhausen. He moved to SSV Reutlingen in 2014.

In summer 2018 Gurski left VfB Eichstätt for SpVgg Unterhaching. In 2019, aged 40, he agreed a two-year contract extension with Unterhaching.

After retiring
After retiring in the summer 2015, Gurski signed with SG Sonnenhof Großaspach as goalkeeper coach.

Honours
TuS Koblenz
 Promotion to 2. Bundesliga: 2006

References

External links
 
 

1979 births
Living people
German footballers
SSV Reutlingen 05 players
SpVgg Unterhaching players
TuS Koblenz players
SV Wehen Wiesbaden players
2. Bundesliga players
3. Liga players
Regionalliga players
Association football goalkeepers
VfB Eichstätt players
SG Sonnenhof Großaspach players
Sportspeople from Tübingen
Footballers from Baden-Württemberg